William Henry Murch (18 November 1867 – 1 May 1928) was an English cricketer active from 1889 to 1906 who played for Gloucestershire and London County. He appeared in 88 first-class matches as a righthanded batsman who bowled right arm medium pace. He scored 1,337 runs with a highest score of 58 and held 41 catches. An occasional wicketkeeper, he also completed one stumping. He took 207 wickets with a best analysis of eight for 68.

References

1867 births
1928 deaths
English cricketers
Gloucestershire cricketers
Cricketers from Bristol
London County cricketers
North v South cricketers
W. G. Grace's XI cricketers